is a Japanese volleyball player. She plays as a setter for Japan women's national volleyball team.

Career 
Koyomi Tominaga's career began at the elementary school when she started playing volleyball at the age of 9. Then she joined the volleyball team of Shimokitazawa Seitoku Senior High School in 2005. In the same year, she was chosen to join Japan's national youth squad to participate in the Under-17 Asian Youth Championship.

In 2006, she was again chosen as a member of the national team to participate in the Under-18 Asian Junior Volleyball Championship. She also played in the FIVB Women’s Junior World Championship in the following year.

After graduating from senior high school, she joined the V.Premier League club Pioneer Red Wings in 2008.

At the end of the 2013-14 season, she moved to the Ageo Medics after Tohoku Pioneer announced the termination of the Red Wings.

She played for Lardini Filottrano of Italian Serie A1 in the 2018-19 season, on loan from Ageo Medics.

National team 
In 2009, she made her debut in Japan's senior national team, participating in the 2009 FIVB Women's World Grand Champions Cup and in the 2010 FIVB Volleyball World Grand Prix. She also participated in the 2017 FIVB World Grand Champions Cup, where she won the Best Setter Award.

References

External links
 FIVB Profile

1989 births
Living people
People from Komae, Tokyo
Sportspeople from Tokyo Metropolis
Japanese women's volleyball players
Volleyball players at the 2018 Asian Games
Ageo Medics players
Asian Games competitors for Japan